Sphincterochila candidissima is a species of air-breathing land snail, a terrestrial pulmonate gastropod mollusk in the family Sphincterochilidae.

Subspecies 
 Sphincterochila candidissima crassa (Pallary, 1926)

Distribution 
This species occurs in France,  Italy, Malta and other areas.

Shell description 
The shell is subimperforate, globose, solid and cretaceous. The shell has 5 whorls, rather flattened, the upper ones carinate above the suture, carina afterwards becoming evanescent. The last whorl is deflected in front. The peristome is subpatulous, thickened within.

The width of the shell is 16–25 mm.

References
This article incorporates public domain text from reference.

 Bank, R. A.; Neubert, E. (2017). Checklist of the land and freshwater Gastropoda of Europe. Last update: July 16th, 2017.

External links 
 Animal base info on this species
 Draparnaud, J. P. R. (1801). Tableau des mollusques terrestres et fluviatiles de la France. Montpellier / Paris (Renaud / Bossange, Masson & Besson). 1-116.
 Kobelt, W. (1903). Diagnosen neuer Arten. Nachrichtsblatt der Deutschen Malakozoologischen Gesellschaft. 35 (9/10): 145-151. Frankfurt am Main
 Abbes, I., Nouira, S. & Neubert, E. (2011). Spincterochilidae from Tunisia, with a note on the subgenus Rima Pallary, 1910 (Gastropoda, Pulmonata). ZooKeys, 151: 1-15. Sofia

Sphincterochilidae
Gastropods described in 1801